Rafael Suárez (born 23 March 1972) is a Venezuelan Olympian fencer and USA International Team fencer. He competed in the individual and  team foil events at the 1996 Summer Olympics and individual at the 2000 Summer Olympics.  He is a former United States Fencing Association Athlete Representative of Men's Foil  and member of the Scholastic/Collegiate Task Force Committee. He hold the Athlete Representative position from 2010 until 2016. Suárez is the current Chairman of the Gold Coast Florida Division of the US Fencing.

In June 2010 Suárez competed in the World Cup for the US Team winning a bronze medal in the individual event.

References

External links
 

1972 births
Living people
Venezuelan male foil fencers
Olympic fencers of Venezuela
Fencers at the 1996 Summer Olympics
Pan American Games medalists in fencing
Pan American Games bronze medalists for Venezuela
Fencers at the 1999 Pan American Games
Central American and Caribbean Games medalists in fencing
Central American and Caribbean Games silver medalists for Venezuela
Central American and Caribbean Games bronze medalists for Venezuela
Competitors at the 1990 Central American and Caribbean Games
Competitors at the 1993 Central American and Caribbean Games
Medalists at the 1991 Pan American Games
Medalists at the 1995 Pan American Games
Medalists at the 1999 Pan American Games